The 1950 Yale Bulldogs football team represented Yale University in the 1950 college football season.  The Bulldogs were led by third-year head coach Herman Hickman, played their home games at the Yale Bowl and finished the season with a 6–3 record.

Schedule

References

Yale
Yale Bulldogs football seasons
Yale Bulldogs football